Locomotion was a Latin American cable channel dedicated to anime and animated shows targeting primarily an 18–34 audience, broadcasting movies, TV series and shorts. It was launched on November 1, 1996, and was closed down on July 31, 2005. It was also broadcast in Portugal through Cabovisão and TVCabo (now ZON Multimédia), and in Spain by satellite TV provider Vía Digital until 2003 due to administrative reasons with the TV operator.

Initially, Locomotion was a channel dedicated to animation for all ages, broadcasting titles from King Features (which was Hearst's animation division), other acquired shows, and adult animation for an evening block. However, the channel did not want to face competition against the already-established Nickelodeon and Cartoon Network, so the channel began removing the children's animation in favour for alternative animation, adult series, and anime by 1998, and by 2000, they began airing more alternative and adult-oriented animation from the US, the United Kingdom and Latin America, as well as anime series.

As the network grew, most of their programming consisted of Japanese animation titles from the likes of ADV Films, Bandai Entertainment, & Geneon and others as well as adult shows like South Park, The Critic, Crapston Villas and Duckman. Locomotion was also dedicated to showing works of experimental animation from all over the world throughout the day on-air and online. They aired experimental programming featuring video jockeys, artists who worked with video as a medium.

The network, whose corporate offices were based in Miami, Florida (though the network was not available in the United States aside from a few cable systems in southern Florida) was a joint venture between the US-based Hearst Corporation, (50%) and Claxson Interactive Group, Inc. (a subsidiary of the Venezuelan-based Cisneros Group) (50%). It was on DirecTV Latin America, due to Cisneros' involvement in the satellite provider's parent Galaxy Latin America along with Hughes Electronics (formerly Hughes Aircraft Company), owners of the DirecTV brand (and constructor of the various HS-601 satellites DirecTV Latin America used to broadcast). In May 2002, Cisneros Group sold its shares in the network to Canadian-based Corus Entertainment.
The channel was purchased by Sony in 2005 and was later rebranded as Animax.

Loco
One of Locomotion's VJ projects was a computer-rendered character known as Loco, produced by "Modern Cartoons". The character, which mostly appeared during commercial breaks, made humorous comments, and did nonsensical things entertaining the viewers. The mascot disappeared as the channel changed its image.

A final, yet brief reference of Loco when Animax replaced Locomotion, which is the part where the special agents sent to save Locomotion, they received a call from "Loco" before he gets killed.

Logo history 
Locomotion's first logo resembled a red head with a "Loco" on its face (the "O"s being in where the eyes are, the "L" being in where the left ear is, and the "C" being in where the nose is) and a "Motion" in its mouth. This was used since the launch of the channel and was phased out in 1999 as the channel began shifting towards alternative and adult animation series, such as South Park, as well as anime series.
	
Locomotion's second logo retained the head from the previous logo, although colored white and inside a gray circle and lacking the details the previous logo had. The "Locomotion" was shown left of the "circle" in an Italicized font. This was used from 1999 to May 2002.
	
Locomotion's third logo was the same as the previous logo, but the "circle" now colored (most of the time red and blue) as opposed to gray and the logo was updated. This logo was used since Claxson's sale of their stake in the channel to Corus Entertainment, all the way until the closure of the channel.
	
A variation of the third logo had the words "Animestation" below the "Locomotion" of the logo since the channel ceased to broadcast in Spain and Portugal. It was used from 2004 until the closure of the channel in 2005.

TV blocks
The programming of this channel was divided in thematic blocks which are:

 80's TV: A space dedicated to all cartoons that were a hit in the decade.
 Anime Loving: As its name says, a space dedicated to anime lovers.
 Japanimotion/JapanOK!: A space dedicated to better Japanese animation, hidden gems of anime, Anime films and anime series.
 Animafilms: A space dedicated to hidden International animation gems.
 Fracto: A space dedicated to experimental animation and techno music.
 Cortos Locomotion: Short films between each space of TV programs.
 Love Vision: Short animations and experimental music broadcast between TV programs.
 Replay: The best of the week.
 Kapsula: Space dedicated to the best directors of experimental animation and where the people can send their works.

Acquisition, shutdown and aftermath
Locomotion was bought by Sony Pictures Entertainment Latin America in January 2005 from Hearst Corporation and Corus Entertainment. After the acquisition of the network and until its shutdown, the non-anime shows where dropped from their programming in order to focus more on an all anime line-up. The network officially ceased to exist at 11:00 a.m. on July 31 of the same year (however, the broadcast of Locomotion stopped on the night of July 30 and was replaced by a countdown clock). From then on, the network had been transformed into the Latin American branch of Animax.

Of all the programming broadcast previously on Locomotion, only Vandread, Saber Marionette J, Saber Marionette J to X, Soul Hunter, Serial Experiments Lain, The Candidate for Goddess and Earth Girl Arjuna were picked and broadcast by Animax on their early programming. As of February 2006, all those series were off the air. Neon Genesis Evangelion and Super Milk Chan, both which had aired on Locomotion, would also air on Animax, although 3 years after Locomotion's shutdown, and in the case for Evangelion, it got a new Spanish dub.

The non-anime shows produced by MTV Networks and broadcast on Locomotion (like South Park, Ren and Stimpy and Æon Flux) were picked and shown on a weekend animation block by MTV Latin America, but in November 2006, this block was replaced with Animatosis (a Sic 'Em Friday-alike block) and all the shows (with the exception of South Park) were cancelled, and South Park continues to air as of present day, and recently now airs on a localized version of its home network. Bob and Margaret is shown (as of January 2006) on the defunct-but-now-relaunched Latin American version of Adult Swim. The Critic was broadcast on the Latin American version of HBO (albeit in English with Spanish and Portuguese subtitles). Other shows, such as Dr. Katz and Duckman, have not aired on Latin American television since the Locomotion shutdown.

Programming

Anime 
 Alexander Senki
 Blue Seed
 Boogiepop Phantom
 Bubblegum Crisis Tokyo 2040 - Latin America only
 Burn Up Excess
 Candidate for Goddess
 Cybuster
 Cyber Team in Akihabara
 Cowboy Bebop - Latin America only
 Earth Girl Arjuna
 Eat-Man
 Eat-Man '98
 Gasaraki - Latin America only
 Gene Shaft
 If I See You in My Dreams
 Let's Dance With Papa
 Lupin III - also known as Cliffhanger - Latin America only
 Neon Genesis Evangelion
 Nightwalker — The Midnight Detective
 Oh! Super Milk-Chan
 Petshop of Horrors
 Ranma ½ - Iberia only
 Red Baron- Latin America only
 Robotech
 Saber Marionette J
 Saber Marionette J to X
 Serial Experiments Lain
 Silent Möbius
 Soul Hunter
 The Adventures of Mini Goddess
 Those Who Hunt Elves 1 y 2- Latin America only

OVAs 
 Agent Aika
 Afroken
 Birdy the Mighty
 Blue Submarine No. 6 (Aonorokugo)
 Burn Up W
 Compiler
 Compiler Festa
 Dirty Pair: Flight 005 Conspiracy
 Ellcia
 éX-Driver
 Gunsmith Cats
 If I See You in my Dreams
 Labyrinth of Flames
 Ninja Resurrection
 Oh! My Goddess
 Power Dolls
 Tenamonya Voyagers
 Saber Marionette R
 Saber Marionette J Again
 Sakura Mail
 Shutendoji
 Suikoden Demon Century
 Sukeban Deka
 Tarepanda 
 Virgin Fleet
 Welcome to Pia Carrot!! 2 DX
 Yakumo Tatsu

Cartoons 
 Æon Flux - Latinamerica only
 Bob and Margaret
 Captain Star - Latinamerica only
 Crapston Villas
 Cuttlas
 Dr. Katz, Professional Therapist
 Duckman - Latinamerica only
 Gary and Mike
 Gogs
 Home to Rent - Latinamerica only
 Journey to Infinity - Iberia only
 Quads!
 Pond Life
 Ren and Stimpy - Latinamerica only
 Rex the Runt
 Robin - By Magnus Carlsson
 South Park
 Stressed Eric
 The Critic - Latinamerica only
 The Head - Latinamerica only
 The Maxx - Latinamerica only

Films 
 Akira
 Alexander Senki
 City Hunter: Bay City Wars
 City Hunter: Magnum with Love and Fate
 City Hunter: Million Dollar Conspiracy
 Dirty Pair: Project Eden
 Fallen Angels
 Flatworld and The Making of Flatworld
 Ghost in the Shell
 Glassy Ocean
 Jin-Roh: The Wolf Brigade
 Juego de niños
 La Vieille Dame et les Pigeons (Old Lady and the Pigeons)
 Martian Successor Nadesico: The Prince of Darkness
 Megasónicos
 Opera Imaginaire
 Phantom 2040
 Rail of the Star
 Robert Creep: A Dog's Life
 The Super Dimension Fortress Macross: Do You Remember Love?
 The Tale of Shim Chung
 Torpedo
 Truckers
 Vampiros en la Habana
 Wallace and Gromit: A Close Shave
 Wallace and Gromit: A Grand Day Out
 Wallace and Gromit: The Wrong Trousers

The titles above belong mainly to British and American companies, most of them come from Paramount channels (like MTV and Comedy Central) and Channel 4 from Great Britain.

Locomotion also had an hour block called Locotomia where international experimental animations where aired.

The Wallace and Gromit movies and Flatworld were also aired along with other British animated short films.

Never transmitted 
 Silent Service
 Outlaw Star
 Martian Successor Nadesico
 Blue Seed 2
 The End of Evangelion
 Golgo 13 (Film)

Acquired, but unaired 
List of titles Locomotion picked up the rights to air, but couldn't broadcast because of its closure. These titles eventually aired on Animax Latin America:

 .hack//Legend of the Twilight
 .hack//SIGN
 Di Gi Charat Nyo
 DNA²
 Galaxy Angel
 Pita Ten
 Ran, The Samurai Girl
 Stratos 4
 Wolf's Rain

Short films and experimental animation 
 A Chairy Tale (1957)
 Abductees
 Alice in Plasmaland
 Anna and Bella
 A Piece of Phantasmagoria
 Arnold Escapes From Church
 At The Ends Of The Earth
 Bob's Birthday
 Boogie Doodle
 Dada
 Dots
 El Egoísta
 Historia del Gato y la Luna
 Hen Hop
 How Wings Are Attached to the Backs of Angels
 I'm Your Man
 Jolly Roger
 La Leyenda de la Canoa Voladora
 Lennart's Top Tips
 Lupo the Butcher
 Mad Doctors of Borneo
 Manipulation
 Meat Love (1989)
 Mindscape
 Monkey Love
 Neighbours (1952)
 Next
 Noiseman Sound Insect
 Opus Dei - By Cecile Noldus
 Os Salteadores
 Prelude to Eden
 Promethevs
 Screen Play (Takako and Naoki) - By Barry Purves (1993)
 Steel Life
 Street of Crocodiles
 The Balance
 The Cat Came Back
 The Fly
 The Monk and the Fish
 The Sandman
 The Stain
 The Big Snit

VJs and design projects 
Locomotion was not only about adult animation and anime. On the last years of being on air, Locomotion seemed to be interest also in Graphic Design and techno music (House and Lounge or Chill-Out).

In the early 2000s, graphic designers began to dabble in web animation to promote their portfolio and collaborate with other artists. Thus it was that Locomotion Channel, during the second half of its on-screen life, sponsored efforts to bring designers and animators together in time-lapse to win experimental animation shorts. This dynamic brought more content onto the screen, giving it an atmosphere of creativity that showed no limits.

A clear example of these experimental animation samples was "Teevey". Teevey was a short animation written and directed by Robert Ramsden, animated with Adobe Flash (formerly Macromedia Flash) software by Simon Pike, accompanied by the catchy melody composed by Phillip Minss at Yellow Bird Studios. Robert Ramsden designed his character especially at the request of the channel. The protagonist of this drawing is a kind of giant dog that lives in a world far from any logic or meaning.

Thanks to Locomotion, groups like Boeing and Miranda! began their career, today being recognized by MTV.

Locomotion had a 30 min. block, called Fracto, where they featured music and design experiments that could be considered as experimental animation.

References

External links 
 WebArchive.org (old versions from WebArchive.org)
  (article from Argentinian newspaper Pagina12, in Spanish)

Latin American cable television networks
Television stations in Spain
Television stations in Portugal
Defunct television channels
Former Corus Entertainment networks
Hearst Communications assets
Sony Pictures Television
Sony Pictures Entertainment
Anime television
Children's television networks
Television channels and stations established in 1996
Television channels and stations disestablished in 2005